Mona Borzouee is an Iranian poet and songwriter. Borzouee is known for writing Persian song lyrics for several well-known Iranian musicians. She was arrested in October 2022 during the Iranian protests following the death of Mahsa Amini.

Background 
Borzouee first gained recognition for writing the lyrics to Shadmehr Aghili's song, Ashk-e man (lit. "my tear") in 2003.
She has written song lyrics for many of Iran's most celebrated Persian-speaking musicians, including Aref, Googoosh, Ebi, Mehdi Yarrahi, Shadmehr Aghili, Majid Akhshabi, Ali Lohrasbi, and Ehsan Khajeh Amiri.

In 2013, she published a collection of her lyrics, titled Taghdir (lit. "destiny").

Allameh Tabataba'i University cancelled Borzouee's workshop on songwriting after Iran's state TV ran a disparaging news segment about her.

Arrest 
Security forces arrested Borzouee on 28 September 2022, during Mahsa Amini protests, for statements she had made on her twitter account.

See also 
‌Mahsa Amini protests
Detainees of the September 2022 Iranian protests
Human rights in Iran

Sources 

Living people
1984 births
Iranian women poets
Poets from Tehran